The Château de Coucy is a French castle in the commune of Coucy-le-Château-Auffrique, in Picardy, built in the 13th century and renovated by Eugène Viollet-le-Duc in the 19th century. 
During its heyday, it was famous for the size of its central tower and the pride of its lords, who adopted the staunchly independent rhyme: roi ne suis, ne prince ne duc ne comte aussi; Je suis le sire de Coucy ("I am not king, nor prince nor duke nor count; I am the Lord of Coucy").

Background
The castle was constructed in the 1220s by Enguerrand III, Lord of Coucy. The castle proper occupies the tip of a bluff or falaise. It forms an irregular trapezoid of 92 x 35 x 50 x 80 m. At the four corners are cylindrical towers 20 m in diameter (originally 40 m in height). Between two towers on the line of approach was the massive donjon (keep). The donjon was the largest in Europe, measuring 35 meters wide and 55 meters tall. The smaller towers surrounding the court were as big as the donjons being built at that time by the French monarchy. The rest of the bluff is covered by the lower court of the castle, and the small town.
Coucy was occupied in September 1914 by German troops during World War I. It became a military outpost and was frequented by German dignitaries, including Emperor Wilhelm II himself. In March 1917 the retreating German army, on order of General Erich Ludendorff, destroyed the keep and the 4 towers. It is not known whether this act had some military purpose or was merely an act of wanton destruction. The destruction caused so much public outrage that in April 1917 the ruins were declared "a memorial to barbarity". War reparations were used to clear the towers and to consolidate the walls but the ruins of the keep were left in place.

One of its lords, Enguerrand VII (1340–1397) is the subject of historian Barbara Tuchman's study of the fourteenth century A Distant Mirror. It also features extensively in British author Anthony Price's 1982 crime/espionage novel The Old Vengeful.

Château de Coucy has been listed as a monument historique by the French Ministry of Culture since 1862, and is managed by the Centre des monuments nationaux.

Gallery

See also
 List of castles in France

References

Bibliography
 Corvisier, Christian. Le château de Coucy et l'enceinte de la ville, Itinéraires Picardie. Éditions du Patrimoine, Centre des Monuments Nationaux. .
 Laurent,  Jean-Marc. Le château féodal de Coucy. La Vague verte, 2001.
 Leson, Richard. "′Partout la figure du lion′: Thomas of Marle and the Enduring Legacy of the Coucy Donjon Tympanum," Speculum 93.1 (2018):27-71. 
 Melleville, Maximilien. Histoire de la ville et des sires de Coucy-le-Château. Fleury et A. Chevergny, 1848.
 Mesqui, Jean. Île-de-France Gothique 2: Les demeures seigneuriales. Paris: Picard, 1988; pp. 134–59. .
 Mesqui, Jean. Les programmes résidentiels du château de Coucy du XIIIe au XVIe siècle, p. 207-247, dans Congrès archéologique de France. Aisne méridionale, Société française d'archéologie, Paris, 1994.
 Viollet-le-Duc, Eugène. Description du château de Coucy. Bance éditeur, 1861.

External links

 A description of the castle by Viollet-le-Duc 
 Official website
 Collection of old postcards from Coucy 

Castles in Hauts-de-France
Monuments historiques of Hauts-de-France
Ruins in Hauts-de-France
Museums in Aisne
Historic house museums in Hauts-de-France
Monuments of the Centre des monuments nationaux